St. Joseph's Technical Institute is a Pakistani vocational school for motor mechanics, welders and electricians in Faisalabad, Punjab.

History and operations
The institute to train school dropouts was the dream of Father Clement Sethupathy, a Sri Lankan missionary in Pakistan, since 1965. In 1985, he initiated a project that would make technical skills training available to them.

Feasibility studies were done, plans made, and funding agencies contacted over several years. In August 1990, Misereor, the German Catholic bishops' development aid agency, agreed to finance the entire project.

Its first batch of motor mechanics, welders and electricians graduated in 1993, after a single year of operation.  The 27 graduates participating in the first commencement ceremonies on October 22, 1993, were addressed by Father Bashir Francis, vicar general of the Roman Catholic Diocese of Faisalabad.

In 1997, there were 45 young men learning and honing their skills in auto mechanics, electrical mechanics, plumbing and welding at the school, which has facilities to train 75 students at a time.

Admission
To qualify, a youth must be 15 to 24 years of age and must have completed eighth grade in school.

Facilities
The institute comprises the technical school and a residential Boys' Town. These are complementary and interdependent, both aiming to help young Christian men find more and better opportunities in life.

Spread over three hectares in the suburbs of Faisalabad, the institute houses boarders as well as enrolling day students for technical courses.

Administration
In 2003, the Marist Brothers took over the management of the institute. On September 11, 2006, the Marist Brothers celebrated their forty-year presence in Pakistan with a thanksgiving Mass at the institute.

See also

 Christianity in Pakistan
 Education in Pakistan
 List of boarding schools
 List of educational institutions in Faisalabad

References

1992 establishments in Pakistan
Boarding schools in Pakistan
Boys' schools in Pakistan
Educational institutions established in 1992
Marist Brothers schools
Catholic boarding schools
Catholic secondary schools in Pakistan
Schools in Faisalabad
Vocational education in Pakistan
Vocational schools
Catholic Church in Pakistan